The 2018 Reykjavik Tournament was the 18th season of Iceland's annual men's pre-season tournament. The tournament involved nine of Reykjavík's top football sides from the top two leagues in Iceland, Úrvalsdeild karla and 1. deild karla, and used a combination of group and knockout rounds to determine which team was the winner of the tournament. The competition began on 6 January 2018 and concluded on 5 February 2018.

Groups

Group A

ÍR - Fjölnir results are changed to 0-3 due to ÍR's use of unregistered players

Matches

Group B

Matches

Semifinals
The top two teams from each group entered the semifinals stage. The ties were played on 1 February 2018 at Egilshöll, Reykjavík, one after the other.

Final
The 2018 Reykjavik Tournament final was contested between  the winners of the two semifinal matches. The final was played at Egilshöll, Reykjavík, on 5 February 2018.

Top scorers

References

Football in Iceland